Neon Golden is the fifth studio album by German indie rock band The Notwist. It was released on 14 January 2002 by City Slang.

Composition 
Neon Golden is rooted in the experimental musical style that The Notwist had moved towards on their previous two studio albums 12 (1995) and Shrink (1998), which found the band eschewing the abrasive rock of their early work and delving into electronic music. The songs on Neon Golden fuse indie rock and electronic elements, taking influence from styles such as glitch and IDM. The A.V. Club described the album as a "synthesis of dreamy indie-rock balladry and stark electronic underpinnings", while MusicOMH critic Dylan Kilby referred to it as a work of "electronic post-rock".

Critical reception 

At Metacritic, which assigns a weighted average score out of 100 to reviews from mainstream critics, Neon Golden received an average score of 89 based on 20 reviews, indicating "universal acclaim". The album was acclaimed upon its initial release in Europe in 2002, while in the United States, it was widely hyped well before its official February 2003 release date due to its circulation via import copies and file sharing. In The Village Voices 2003 Pazz & Jop poll, Neon Golden was voted by critics as the year's 33rd best album.

Pitchfork ranked Neon Golden at number 131 on its list of the 200 best albums of the 2000s. Neon Golden has been cited by critics as a landmark album of indie electronic, or "indietronica", music; Tristan Gatward of Loud and Quiet remarked in 2019 that the sound of indie electronic music in the 2000s "was dictated" by the record. In 2014, PopMatters writer Jose Solis described it as a "truly groundbreaking" album that "set in motion an electronica-meets-indie rock revolution that [would] define the sound of a decade."

Track listing 

Sample credits
 "Solitaire" contains elements from Drowning by Numbers, composed by Michael Nyman.

Personnel 
Credits are adapted from the album's liner notes.

The Notwist
 Markus Acher
 Micha Acher
 Martin Gretschmann
 Martin Messerschmid

Additional musicians
 Biboul F. Darouiche – conga
 Roberto Di Gioia – keyboards, piano
 Johannes Enders – tenor saxophone
 Sebastian Hess – cello
 Robert Klinger – double bass
 Saam – cajón, kanjira, zarb
 Ulrich Wangenheim – bass clarinet, alto saxophone, tenor saxophone

Production
 Chris Blair – mastering
 Galore – production
 O.L.A.F. Opal – mixing, recording
 Mario Thaler – mixing, recording

Design
 Philipp Arnold – cover design
 Andreas Gerth – cover design

Charts

References

External links 
 

2002 albums
The Notwist albums
City Slang albums
Domino Recording Company albums
Virgin Records albums